Messages from the Sea (translit. Rassayel El Bahr) is a 2010 Egyptian drama film directed by Daoud Abdel Sayed. The film was selected as the Egyptian entry for the Best Foreign Language Film at the 83rd Academy Awards, but it did not make the final shortlist.

Cast
 Asser Yassin as Yehia
 Sam Habib as David
 Salah Abdallah as Hajj Hashim
 Basma Ahmad as Nora
 Samia Asaad as Carla
 Doaa Hegazy as Riham
 Ahmed Kamal
 Mai Kassab as Besa
 Mohamed Lotfy as Abeel

See also
 List of submissions to the 83rd Academy Awards for Best Foreign Language Film
 List of Egyptian submissions for the Academy Award for Best Foreign Language Film

References

External links
 

2010 films
2010s Arabic-language films
2010 drama films
Films set in Alexandria
Egyptian drama films